Strelnoshirokoye is a rural locality (a selo) and the administrative center of Stelnoshirokovskoye Rural Settlement, Dubovsky District, Volgograd Oblast, Russia. The population was 720 as of 2010. There are 9 streets.

Geography 
Strelnoshirokoye is located in steppe, 41 km northeast of Dubovka (the district's administrative centre) by road. Rodniki is the nearest rural locality.

References 

Rural localities in Dubovsky District, Volgograd Oblast